Ollie John Edward Jones (born 23 April 1996) is a New Zealand racing cyclist, who currently rides for UCI ProTeam . Jones received his  contract as the winner of the 'Zwift Academy Programme' in 2018, in which over 9200 cyclists competed.

Major results
2020
 4th UCI Esports World Championships
2021
 10th Overall New Zealand Cycle Classic
1st Stage 1 (TTT)
2022
 2nd Overall New Zealand Cycle Classic

References

External links

1996 births
Living people
New Zealand male cyclists
People from Upper Hutt
21st-century New Zealand people